The Lesson is a Soviet-Armenian science fiction short film directed by Armenian animator Robert Sahakyants, produced by the Armenfilm studio.

Plot
In the far future, a starship arrives to orbit an undiscovered planet. A group of hunters lands on the planet. On the surface of the planet is detected life: unknown animals, but very similar to terrestrial counterparts, and vegetation resembling that of planet Earth. A frivolous extermination of the local fauna and flora begins.

Suddenly it turns out that the planet is able to punish aggressive intruders. Having taught the people a hard lesson, not killing, but allowing them to feel yourself in the shoes of 
another being.

Music
In the credits, authors and performers of music is not specified. The songs used were "Rockit" by Herbie Hancock, "Nightflight to Venus" by Boney M., and "Imagine" by John Lennon.

External links
 
 
 
 Урок (The lesson) at Animator.ru
 Урок (The lesson) на Big Cartoon DataBase
 
 

Russian animated short films
Soviet animated films
Soviet science fiction films
Armenian animation
1980s science fiction films
Armenian short films
English-language Armenian films
Armenian science fiction films
Soviet-era Armenian films
1987 multilingual films
Soviet multilingual films
Armenian multilingual films